Munger, Tolles, & Olson LLP (MTO) is a Californian law firm with offices in Los Angeles, San Francisco, and Washington, D.C. Charles Munger founded the firm in 1962 along with six other attorneys.

Legal practice

Munger, Tolles & Olson is known for its defense of corporations in civil lawsuits and individuals in criminal trials and investigations. The American Lawyer described the firm as an "army of trial lawyers capable of waging war."

The firm typically hires graduates of the most prestigious law schools with "impeccable grades, law review, and a federal clerkship" and promotes from within. Known for its egalitarian culture, Munger Tolles maintains a 1:1 partner-to-associate ratio where each lawyer gets an equal vote in hiring decisions. Nearly half of the attorneys who started at the firm in the last twenty years continue to practice there.

The firm also places high value on judicial clerkships; around 80% of its attorneys have clerked for federal or state judges with 18 attorneys having clerked for justices on the U.S. Supreme Court. All but one of President Obama's appointments to the United States Court of Appeals for the Ninth Circuit in California have been Munger Tolles alumni.

Recognition 

In 2008, Munger, Tolles & Olson ranked as the nation's top law firm on the American Lawyer A-List based on financial performance, pro bono practice, associate satisfaction and workplace diversity. The firm topped the "A-List" of the nation's most elite law firms again in 2009 and 2010.  After three years at the top of the list, the firm took second place in the 2011 rankings.

In 2015, Vault ranked the firm first in the nation for selectivity, and sixth in transparency. Additionally, the firm ranked third on the American Lawyer's 2011 Diversity Scorecard, with 23.4% of the firm's attorneys and 16.1% of the firm's partners as minorities.

Notable representations

Litigation 

 The Getty Trust after allegations of wrongdoing in the acquisition of its antiquities collection;
 Michael Ovitz in defending his executive pay at Disney;
 California candidate for governor Bill Simon after a jury returned a $78 million verdict for fraud;
 Southern California Edison in the reorganization of California's energy industry;
 Merrill Lynch in the bankruptcy of Orange County;
 The Philippines against Imelda Marcos and Ferdinand Marcos;
 Several couples and Equality California in a California Supreme Court petition challenging the constitutionality of Proposition 8.
 Defense of AFTERMATH RECORDS regarding the percentage of royalties owed for digital downloads (known as the "Eminem decision").
 Defense of ABC's reality show The Glass House in a lawsuit by CBS alleging copyright infringement.
 Defended and lost the case of self-help speaker James Arthur Ray when he was convicted of criminally negligent homicide for the deaths of three people at a sweat lodge in Sedona, Arizona.

Transactional practice 
The firm's transactional practice has represented:
 Yahoo!'s board of directors during Microsoft's proposed takeover
 Warren Buffett in his $31 billion gift to the Bill and Melinda Gates Foundation
 Berkshire Hathaway in its $22 billion purchase of General Reinsurance and $5 billion investment in Goldman Sachs
 Legal counsel for the construction of the Walt Disney Concert Hall and the Cathedral of Our Lady of the Angels in downtown Los Angeles.

Lawyers

Attorneys 
There are 170 lawyers at Munger, Tolles & Olson. In 2008, the Daily Journal named three attorneys to its list of the most Top 100 Lawyers in California. Attorneys include:

 Jeffrey L. Bleich, former Special Counsel to President Barack Obama and United States Ambassador to Australia
 Robert Denham, former CEO of the investment bank Salomon Brothers during the 1990s and current chairman of the MacArthur Foundation;
 Ronald Olson, a director of Berkshire Hathaway, who was named the most influential lawyer in California by California Law Business;
 Donald B. Verrilli Jr., former U.S. Solicitor General in the Obama administration

Alumni 
 Nancy Bekavac, the first female president of Scripps College;
 Alan Bersin, President Barack Obama's "Border Czar" and former United States Attorney for the Southern District of California;
 Daniel P. Collins, Judge on the United States Court of Appeals for the Ninth Circuit
 Michelle Friedland, Judge on the United States Court of Appeals for the Ninth Circuit
 Carla Anderson Hills, former U.S. Trade Representative and former Secretary of Health and Human Services;
 Roderick Hills, former White House Counsel and Chairman of the U.S. Securities and Exchange Commission (SEC);
 Brett Kavanaugh, Justice of the Supreme Court of the United States
 Leondra Kruger, Justice of the California Supreme Court
 Carolyn Kuhl, judge on the Superior Court of California for the County of Los Angeles and former Deputy Solicitor General at the Department of Justice;
 Felicia Marcus, Chairman of California State Water Resources Control Board
 Vilma Socorro Martínez, United States Ambassador to Argentina and past president of the Mexican American Legal Defense and Educational Fund (MALDEF);
 Charles Munger, vice chairman of Berkshire Hathaway
 John B. Owens, Judge on the United States Court of Appeals for the Ninth Circuit
 Paul J. Watford, Judge on the United States Court of Appeals for the Ninth Circuit

See also
List of law firms
White-shoe firm

References

External links
Munger, Tolles & Olson website
American Lawyer profile of the firm after placing first on the A-List
L.A. Times article about the firm
Chambers and Partners profile

Law firms based in Los Angeles
Law firms established in 1962